The Central European mixed forests ecoregion (WWF ID: PA0412) is a temperate hardwood forest covering much of northeastern Europe, from Germany to Russia. The area is only about one-third forested, with pressure from human agriculture leaving the rest in a patchwork of traditional pasture, meadows, wetlands. The ecoregion is in the temperate broadleaf and mixed forest biome, and the Palearctic realm, with a Humid Continental climate.

Location and description 
The ecoregion covers the formerly-glaciated central plains of Central Europe, from eastern Germany and the shores of the Baltic Sea, through large parts of the Czech Republic, Poland, Southern Lithuania, Belarus, Western and Central Ukraine, and a part of Russia (in Bryansk and Kaliningrad Oblasts).  The terrain is mostly flat lowlands in the center, hilly moraine-dominated in the north, and uplands to the south along the Carpathian mountains.  To the north is the Sarmatic mixed forests ecoregion, the forests of which feature more spruce and pine.  To the east is the East European forest steppe, in which the forest stands thin out into grasslands.  To the south is the Carpathian montane forests ecoregion, featuring mountain pastures and forests of beech, spruce, elm, and dwarf pine.  Also to the north are the Baltic mixed forests of oaks, hornbeam, and linden trees on flat, acidic soils.  To the west is the Western European broadleaf forests ecoregion, which is now mostly cultivated agricultural land.

Climate 
The portions of the ecoregion in Germany and western Poland have a climate that is classified as Marine west coast (Cfb). The eastern part has a climate of Humid continental climate, warm summer (Köppen climate classification (Dfb)). The summers become hotter and the winters colder as you move east across the ecoregion, due to the movement towards the center of the continent ("continentality"). Precipitation average between 500 mm and 700 mm, mostly falling during the summer growing season.

Flora and fauna 
Oak forests are characteristic throughout the region, with some pine forests in the north.  Forest cover ranges from 15% in Ukraine to 33% in the Czech Republic.   The most common tree in the ecoregion, covering half of the forested area, is the Scots pine (Pinus sylvestris), which has been planted extensively over the past 200 years.  The truly mixed deciduous forests have been replaced mostly by agriculture.  The non-forested areas are largely meadows and pastures dedicated to human agricultural uses.  There are also extensive wetlands in the lowlands.
The wetlands support diverse bird communities, but mammals are heavily pressured by human land use.  Because of the uniformity of the terrain and openness to other regions, there are no endemic species in the ecoregion.  In some countries, 20-30 of the mammal species are threatened.

European bison

The Białowieża Forest on the Belarus-Poland border is home to one of the last herds of European bison, also known as wisent, the heaviest surviving wild land animal in Europe Historically, the wisent's range encompassed all of the European lowlands, extending from the Massif Central to the Caucasus. Its range decreased as growing human populations cut down trees. The European bison became extinct in southern Sweden in the 11th century, and southern England in the 12th century. The species survived in the Ardennes and the Vosges until the 15th century before being hunted to extinction. In mid-16th century King Sigismund II Augustus of Poland pronounced a death penalty for poaching a European bison in Białowieża. Despite these measures, its population continued to decline. During World War I, occupying German troops killed 600 wisent for food, hides, and horns. The last wild European bison in Poland was killed in 1919. They were reintroduced from captivity.

Protected areas 
The Central European mixed forests has been affected heavily by human activity. 

19.86% of the ecoregion is in protected areas. Most protected areas are small and fragmented. Some of the large, or more representative, protected areas in the ecoregion include:
 Belovezhskaya Pushcha National Park / Białowieża National Park, are the Belarus and Polish sides, respectively of the side of the Białowieża (Area: 1,500 km2 / 150 km2)
 Białowieża Forest (Belarus, Poland), the last large fragment of Old-growth forest that used to stretch across the European Plain. (Area: 3,086 km2)
 Biebrza National Park, the largest national park in Poland, is 25% forested, the remainder is field, meadow, and marsh. (Area: 592 km2)
 Bryansky Les Nature Reserve, is an area of old-growth forest on the eastern tip of the ecoregion in Bryansk Oblast, Russia. (Area: 122 km2)
 Chernobyl Radiation and Ecological Biosphere Reserve, Ukraine (2,269 km2)
 Cozia National Park, Romania (167.25 km2)
 Drawieński National Park, Poland (113.65 km2)
 Hainich National Park, Germany (75.13 km2)
 Kampinoski National Park, Poland (384.59 km2)
 Lower Polissia National Nature Park, in northwestern Ukraine, is representative of the Polesia area of Poland, Belarus, Ukraine and Russia. (Area: 88 km2)
 Middle Elbe Biosphere Reserve, stretches along the Elbe River in Saxon-Anhalt, Germany, covering the largest river-meadow complex in Middle Europe. (Area: 430 km2)
 Narew National Park (Poland), covers wetlands along the moraines of the Narew river, exemplifying a Braided river. (Area: 78 km2)
 Ojcowski National Park, Poland (21.56 km2)
 Orlovskoye Polesye National Park, Poland (842.05 km2)
 Podolskie Tovtry National Park, Ukraine (2613.16 km2)
 Podyjí National Park, Czech Republic (62.79 km2)
 Poleski National Park, Poland (97.7 km2)
 Prypyatskiy National Park, Belarus (634.58 km2)
 Roztoczański National Park, Poland (84.76 km2)
 Shatskiy National Park, Ukraine (325.15 km2)
 Świętokrzyski National Park, Poland (76.35 km2)
 Thayatal National Park, Austria (13.26 km2)
 Ujście Warty National Park, Poland (80.78 km2)
 Lower Oder Valley National Park, Germany
 Wielkopolski National Park, Poland (75.93 km2)
 Wigierski National Park, Poland (150.94 km2)
 Yavorivskyi National Park, Ukraine (70.78 km2)
 Žuvinto Biosphere Reserve, Lithuania (185.81 km2)

External links

References 

 
Ecoregions of Austria
Ecoregions of Belarus
Ecoregions of the Czech Republic
Ecoregions of Europe
Ecoregions of Germany
Ecoregions of Lithuania
Ecoregions of Moldova
Ecoregions of Poland
Ecoregions of Romania
Ecoregions of Russia
Ecoregions of Ukraine
Forests of Belarus
Forests of Poland
Palearctic ecoregions
Temperate broadleaf and mixed forests